Wee Hairy Beasties was a children's music group composed of Jon Langford, Sally Timms, Kelly Hogan, and Devil in a Woodpile. They played their first gig together at the Brookfield Zoo near Chicago, and released an album through Bloodshot Records in 2006 and another in 2008 on Wee Beatz Records.

Discography

Animal Crackers
"Wee Hairy Beasties"
"Flies on My Taters"
"Animal Crackers"
"Ragtime Duck"
"Housefly Blues"
"A Newt Called Tiny"
"I'm an A.N.T."
"Road Safety Song"
"Cuttlefish Bone"
"Glow Worm"
"Buzz Buzz Buzz"
"Cyril the Karaoke Squirrel"
"Toenail Moon"
"Lightnin' the Turtle"
"Wee Hairy Beasties (Reprise)"

Holidays Gone Crazy
 Belly Button Blues
 Here Comes My Shadow
 Yellow Snow P.S.A.
 The Tail of the Night Before...
 Dinosaur Christmas
 Pumpkinhead
 Wee Scary Beasties
 Holidays Gone Crazy
 Eat Your Greens P.S.A.
 Bury Me in the Sand
 The Lonely Vampire
 Tummy Trouble P.S.A.
 Jug Rag

References

External links
Article - "Children's Tunes Revive Spirit of Punk Rock" at NPR.org

American children's musical groups
Bloodshot Records albums
Bloodshot Records artists